Sarah Adiba Mohammed Yussof (born 4 October 1990) is a Malaysian television presenter, a native of Kota Kinabalu, Sabah. She was a former participant of the Clever Girl Malaysia program on TV3.

Early and personal life
Sarah Adiba was born and raised in Kota Kinabalu, Sabah and is the fourth of six children. She is a Bachelor of Petroleum Engineering (Drilling) at PETRONAS University of Technology (UTP). She married Iskandar Mhd Nasir in 2015.

Sarah announces her pregnancy in May 2019 after four years of living together. Sarah left her career to follow Iskandar working in Texas,United States

Career
Sarah Adiba began her early career as an Operations Engineer and previously worked as a tuition teacher. In 2016, she was selected as one of 14 contestants for the first season of 'Clever Girl Malaysia on TV3. After the end of Clever Girl, she became a presenter for 999 crime investigative Reality Series in studio and on the field. After retiring as the presenter for 999, she became one of the 8 presenters on TV3's talk show Borak Kopitiam, which airs every Friday through Sunday from 8:00 to 9:30 am.

Television
 Clever Girl Malaysia (2016) – Herself/participant
 999 (2017–18) – Herself/presenter
 Wanita Hari Ini (2017) – Herself/journalist
 Borak Kopitiam (2018–2020) – Herself/presenter
 Alert (2018) – Herself/presenter

References

External links
 
 

1990 births
Living people
Malaysian people of Malay descent
Malaysian Muslims
People from Sabah
Malaysian television presenters
Malaysian women television presenters
Malaysian journalists
Malaysian women journalists
Universiti Teknologi Petronas alumni